Alan Taymurazovich Karaev (born May 19, 1977) is a Russian sumo wrestler and former mixed martial artist.

Biography
Karaev was born in Digora, North Ossetia and graduated from North Ossetian State University. He became the amateur sumo world champion in 2002 and Russian national champion in 2003. He was also the world arm wrestling champion on seven occasions and Russian national champion multiple times.

He made his debut in mixed martial arts on March 26, 2005 against veteran fighter Gary Goodridge at Hero's 1. Goodridge was able to submit Karaev with a forearm choke in the first round. He returned to face Bob Sapp at Hero's 2 on July 6, 2005 and again lost in the first round, this time via knock out.

On September 17, 2005, he recorded the first win of his career when he knocked out Tomohiko Hashimoto in seven seconds at GCM: D.O.G. 3. This earned his a return to the K-1 Hero's promotion and he took on legendary kickboxer Jérôme Le Banner at K-1 PREMIUM 2005 Dynamite!! on New Year's Eve, 2005. Le Banner defeated Karaev via kicks to the body.

His final fight came on February 4, 2006 when he submitted Koji Kanechika with an americana keylock at a MARS event.

Mixed martial arts record

|-
|Win
|align=center|2-3
| Koji Kanechika
|Submission (americana)
|MARS
|
|align=center|1
|align=center|3:09
|Tokyo, Japan
|
|-
|Loss
|align=center|1-3
| Jérôme Le Banner
|TKO (body kick)
|K-1 PREMIUM 2005 Dynamite!!
|
|align=center|2
|align=center|1:14
|Osaka, Japan
|
|-
|Win
|align=center|1-2
| Tomohiko Hashimoto
|TKO (punches)
|GCM: D.O.G. 3
|
|align=center|1
|align=center|0:07
|Tokyo, Japan
|
|-
|Loss
|align=center|0-2
| Bob Sapp
|KO (punch)
|Hero's 2
|
|align=center|1
|align=center|3:44
|Tokyo, Japan
|
|-
|Loss
|align=center|0-1
| Gary Goodridge
|Submission (forearm choke)
|Hero's 1
|
|align=center|1
|align=center|2:58
|Saitama, Japan
|

References

External links
 

1977 births
Living people
Russian male mixed martial artists
Super heavyweight mixed martial artists
North Ossetian sumo wrestlers
Russian arm wrestlers
Ossetian people
People from Digorsky District
World Games gold medalists
World Games bronze medalists
Competitors at the 2009 World Games
Competitors at the 2013 World Games
Mixed martial artists utilizing Sumo
Sportspeople from North Ossetia–Alania
North Ossetian State University alumni